Erie Railroad Co. v. Tompkins, 304 U.S. 64 (1938), was a landmark U.S. Supreme Court decision in which the Court held that there is no general American federal common law and that U.S. federal courts must apply state law, not federal law, to lawsuits between parties from different states that do not involve federal questions. In reaching this holding, the Court overturned almost a century of federal civil procedure case law, and established the foundation of what remains the modern law of diversity jurisdiction as it applies to United States federal courts.

Although the decision is not widely known by laypeople, most American lawyers and legal scholars regard Erie as one of the most important decisions in U.S. Supreme Court history. The decision "goes to the heart" of the American system of federalism and the relationship between the U.S. federal government and the states.

Legal background
Under the traditional view of the United States's system of federalism, each U.S. state is a sovereign polity in all aspects other than those the U.S. Constitution commits to the federal government, which has supremacy over the states in those areas. Consequently, each U.S. state has its own courts and legal system governing areas such as property law, contract law, tort law, commercial law, criminal law, and family law. Due to the United States's historical origins in the British Empire, all U.S. states except Louisiana have inherited or adopted the English common law for their legal systems.

Shortly after the Constitution was ratified, Congress passed the Judiciary Act of 1789, which created the U.S. federal court system underneath the U.S. Supreme Court. The Act gave U.S. federal courts a type of authority known as diversity jurisdiction, which allows them to hear lawsuits between citizens of different states involving disputes over substantial sums of money, even when no questions of federal law are involved. Section 34 of the Judiciary Act—known as the Rules of Decision Act—provided that federal courts would apply state laws when adjudicating lawsuits between citizens of different states.

Interpreting this statute's meaning has been among the most difficult legal issues in American federal jurisprudence. The statute provides that U.S. federal courts shall apply state law when hearing cases under diversity jurisdiction. But it does not specify whether the phrase "the laws of the several States"  means only statutes passed by a state's legislature, or whether it also includes the common law decisions of a state's supreme court.

The U.S. Supreme Court addressed the question in its 1842 decision Swift v. Tyson. In Swift, the Court ruled that the Rules of Decision Act's phrase "laws of the several States" referred only to each state's statutory laws passed by their legislatures, and did not include each state supreme court's interpretation and construction of the English common law. The Court concluded that this allowed U.S. federal courts to create a general American "federal common law" for federal courts that would cover areas such as commercial law. But applying the Court's holding in Swift proved difficult, and American lawyers, judges, and legal scholars became increasingly opposed to it during the late 19th and early 20th centuries.

Case history
In the early hours of July 27, 1934, a man named Harry Tompkins was walking home along a pathway next to a set of railroad tracks in Hughestown, Pennsylvania. An oncoming train approached and, as it passed, Tompkins was struck by an object—apparently an unlatched door—protruding from one of the train cars. The collision knocked Tompkins to the ground, and his right arm was crushed beneath the train’s wheels. An ambulance took him to a local hospital where doctors amputated most of his right arm.

The train that hit Tompkins was owned and operated by the Erie Railroad Company. After he recovered from his injuries, Tompkins sued Erie Railroad for negligence. Because Tompkins resided in Pennsylvania and Erie Railroad was incorporated in New York, Tompkins invoked diversity jurisdiction and filed his lawsuit in U.S. federal court, rather than Pennsylvania or New York state court. The case was tried in the U.S. District Court for the Southern District of New York, with U.S. district judge Samuel Mandelbaum presiding.

At trial, Erie Railroad argued that Pennsylvania law should govern Tompkins's negligence claim. The pathway along which Tompkins had been walking when the train struck him was an Erie Railroad right-of-way. Previous decisions of the Supreme Court of Pennsylvania had held that, under Pennsylvania law, a person walking along a railroad's right-of-way was a trespasser to whom the railroad was not liable for negligence unless its negligence was "wanton" or "wilful". Because Tompkins had not alleged that Erie Railroad had been wantonly or willfully negligent, the railroad's lawyers made a motion to dismiss his claim, citing these Pennsylvania cases. Mandelbaum denied the motion, ruling that under Swift v. Tyson Tompkins's claim was governed by federal common law, not Pennsylvania law. The trial went forward and, in October 1936, the jury found Erie Railroad liable for Tompkins's injuries and awarded him $30,000 in damages.

Erie Railroad appealed the verdict to the U.S. Court of Appeals for the Second Circuit. A panel consisting of U.S. circuit judges Thomas Walter Swan, Martin Thomas Manton, and Learned Hand heard the appeal and ruled in Tompkins's favor, affirming the trial court's verdict. The railroad then appealed to the U.S. Supreme Court, which agreed to hear the case and granted certiorari.

Supreme Court decision
On April 25, 1938, the Supreme Court issued a 6–2 decision in favor of Erie Railroad that overruled Swift v. Tyson and held that U.S. federal courts must apply state law, not general "federal common law", when adjudicating claims in lawsuits between citizens of different U.S. states.

Opinion of the Court

For the purposes of the decision's core holding, six justices formed the majority and joined an opinion written by justice Louis Brandeis.  

The Court began by framing the case around the question of "whether the oft-challenged doctrine of Swift v. Tyson shall now be disapproved." In the opinion's first section, the Court reviewed the history of the Swift doctrine. The Court referenced the research of American legal scholar Charles Warren, who in a 1923 Harvard Law Review article had published evidence of an earlier draft of the Rules of Decision Act that explicitly included states' common laws in its definition of "the laws of the several states". The Court concluded that Warren's discovery proved that the Swift Court's interpretation of the Act had been "erroneous". 

In the opinion's second section, the Court explained that the Swift doctrine had not produced the legal uniformity the Court had hoped it would, but had instead allowed litigants from other states to discriminate against other litigants in their home states. The Court said that because the Swift doctrine dictated that a lawsuit between two in-state parties would be decided under state law while an identical lawsuit between an in-state party and an out-of-state party would be decided under federal common law, the Swift doctrine was allowing plaintiffs to manipulate which law would be applied to their lawsuits by strategically filing them in specific state or federal courtsa practice now known as "forum shopping". The Court decried this practice, saying that it allowed plaintiffs to introduce "grave discrimination" against parties from other states.

Furthermore, the Court held that the Swift doctrine had not only been a "social and political" failure, but had also been unconstitutional—though the opinion did not explain how.

Having determined that the Swift doctrine was unconstitutional, the opinion's third section declared that there is no general U.S. federal common law, and that U.S. federal courts hearing cases under diversity-of-citizenship jurisdiction must apply state laws as construed by state supreme courts.

The Court emphasized that its ruling was not meant to strike down any federal laws, but was only intended to "declare that in applying the [Swift] doctrine this Court and the lower courts have invaded rights which in our opinion are reserved by the Constitution to the several States."

Applying its holding to the facts of Tompkins's case, the Court held that both the district court and the Second Circuit had erred by not applying Pennsylvania law to Tompkins's claim against Erie Railroad. The Court reversed the Second Circuit's decision and remanded the case, instructing the court to determine whether the railroad company's interpretation of Pennsylvania law had been correct.

Reed's concurrence in the judgment
Justice Stanley F. Reed concurred only in the judgment. Reed agreed with the Court's core holding that Swift v. Tyson should be overruled and that federal courts should apply state law when deciding cases under diversity jurisdiction. But Reed disagreed with the Court's conclusion that the Swift doctrine had been unconstitutional, saying instead that he thought it had been merely an erroneous interpretation of the Rules of Decision Act.

Butler's dissent
Justice Pierce Butler filed a dissenting opinion, joined by Justice James McReynolds, in which he argued the majority had engaged in judicial activism. He asserted the majority had completely rewritten the two questions presented in the petition for certiorari as a constitutional question, when there really was no constitutional issue.  He pointed out that no one in this case had directly challenged the Swift regime, which the Court had adhered to for so long in so many cases.

Aftermath
On remand, the three Second Circuit judges determined that Erie Railroad's characterization of Pennsylvania lawthat a person walking along a railroad right of way was a trespasser to whom the railroad was not liable for negligence unless the negligence was "wanton" or "wilful"had been correct. The judges concluded that Tompkins had neither alleged nor shown any evidence that Erie Railroad's negligence had been "wanton", and they therefore held that Erie Railroad was entitled to a directed verdict. This forced the district court to enter a new judgment in favor of Erie Railroad. Tompkins lost his $30,000 damages award and received nothing.

Subsequent jurisprudence

Later opinions limited the application of Erie to substantive state law; federal courts can generally use the Federal Rules of Civil Procedure while hearing state law claims.

It can be a problem for federal courts to know what a state court would decide on an issue of first impression (i.e., one not previously considered by state courts).  In such circumstances, federal courts engage in what is informally called an "Erie guess."  This "guess," actually a carefully reasoned attempt to anticipate what the state's courts would decide, is not binding on state courts themselves, which may adopt the federal court's reasoning if and when the issue reaches them in some other case, or may decide the issue differently.  In the latter case, future federal courts would be required to follow the state's precedents, although a final judgment in the "guessed" case would not be reopened.

Alternatively, federal courts can certify questions to a state supreme court, so long as the state itself has a procedure in place to allow this.  For example, some federal district (trial) courts can certify questions to state supreme courts, but other states allow only federal courts of appeal (circuit) courts to do so.  In the latter situation, an Erie guess would be the only option available for the federal court attempting to apply state law.

Erie Railroad is considered one of the major examples where the Supreme Court has exceptionally gone against the principle of party presentation, as neither party had suggested a need to review Swift but the Court took it up themselves to review and ultimately overturn it.

See also
 Erie Doctrine
List of United States Supreme Court cases, volume 304

References

Footnotes

Citations

Works cited

External links

Summary of Erie Railroad Co. v. Tompkins

United States Supreme Court decisions that overrule a prior Supreme Court decision
1938 in United States case law
United States Constitution Article Three case law
United States Supreme Court cases
Federal common law case law
Erie Railroad
Luzerne County, Pennsylvania
United States Supreme Court cases of the Hughes Court
Conflict of laws case law
Diversity jurisdiction case law
United States Erie Doctrine
Railway litigation in 1938